Hadda Brooks (October 29, 1916 – November 21, 2002) was an American pianist, vocalist and composer, who was billed as "Queen of the Boogie".  She was Inducted in the Rhythm and Blues Foundation Hall of Fame in 1993.

Career
Her first recording, "Swingin' the Boogie", for Modern Records, was a regional hit in 1945. Another R&B Top Ten hit, "Out of the Blue," was her most famous song.  Brooks preferred ballads to boogie-woogie, but developed the latter style by listening to Albert Ammons, Pete Johnson, and Meade Lux Lewis records. 

In the 1970s, she commuted to Europe for performances in nightclubs and festivals. She performed rarely in the United States, living for many years in Australia. Queen of the Boogie, a compilation of recordings from the 1940s, was released in 1984. Two years later her manager Alan Eichler brought her out of a 16-year retirement to open a jazz room at Perino's in Los Angeles, after which she continued to perform in nightclubs in Hollywood, San Francisco, and New York City. She sang at Hawaii's  statehood ceremony in 1959 and was asked for a private audience by Pope Pius XII.

She resumed her recording career with the 1994 album Anytime, Anyplace, Anywhere for DRG. Virgin Records acquired the old Modern catalogue and, thanks to Brooks' new-found success, issued a compilation of her 1940s and 1950s recordings entitled That's My Desire. The label signed her to record three songs for the Christmas album Even Santa Gets the Blues, made more unusual by the fact she had releases on the same label 50 years apart. Time Was When (Virgin, 1996) included Al Viola (guitar), Eugene Wright (bass) and Richard Dodd (cello), and she wrote two of its songs: "You Go Your Way and I'll Go Crazy" and "Mama's Blues". She began playing at Johnny Depp's Viper Room, the Algonquin Hotel's Oak Room, and Michael's Pub in New York City, and such Hollywood clubs as Goldfinger's, the Vine St. Bar and Grill, and the Hollywood Roosevelt Cinegrill. She celebrated her 80th birthday in 1996 by performing two full shows at Depp's Viper Room.

In 2007, a 72-minute documentary on Brooks's life, Queen of the Boogie, directed by Austin Young and Barry Pett, was presented at the Los Angeles Silver Lake Film Festival.

Personal
Jules Bihari gave her the recording name "Hadda Brooks".

In 1940, Brooks married Earl "Shug" Morrison, of the Harlem Globetrotters, but was widowed within a year, and she never married again. 

Brooks died at the age of 86 at White Memorial Medical Center in Los Angeles after open-heart surgery.

Discography

Filmography

References

External links
 Interview of Hadda Brooks Center for Oral History Research, UCLA Library Special Collections, University of California, Los Angeles

1916 births
2002 deaths
20th-century American women pianists
20th-century American pianists
20th-century American women singers
20th-century African-American women singers
African-American pianists
American blues pianists
Boogie-woogie pianists
Ace Records (United States) artists
Arwin Records artists
Kent Records artists
Modern Records artists
Okeh Records artists
Oldie Blues artists
Musicians from Los Angeles
People from Greater Los Angeles
Women jazz pianists
20th-century American singers
21st-century African-American people
21st-century African-American women